Kalispell Air Force Station (ADC ID: TM-179, NORAD ID: Z-179) is a closed United States Air Force General Surveillance Radar station.

It was closed in 1978 by the Air Force, and the radar site on Blacktail Mountain was turned over to the Federal Aviation Administration (FAA).  Today the radar site is part of the Joint Surveillance System (JSS), designated by NORAD as  Western Air Defense Sector (WADS) Ground Equipment Facility J-78.  The former garrison site at 501 Blacktail Road in Lakeside was acquired by Youth With A Mission in 1985, with the remaining eight houses previously retained by the Air Force for local military recruiters acquired by YWAM via GSA auction in 1992.

History
Kalispell Air Force Station came into existence as part of Phase III of the Air Defense Command Mobile Radar program. On October 20, 1953 ADC requested a third phase of twenty-five radar sites be constructed.

The 716th Aircraft Control and Warning Squadron was assigned to the new station on 1 May 1959.  The squadron started operations with an AN/FPS-7B search radar and a pair of AN/FPS-90 height-finder radars in 1961, and initially the station functioned as a Ground-Control Intercept (GCI) and warning station.  As a GCI station, the squadron's role was to guide interceptor aircraft toward unidentified intruders picked up on the unit's radar scopes.

During 1960 Kalispell AFS joined the Semi Automatic Ground Environment (SAGE) system, initially feeding data to DC-20 at Malmstrom AFB, Montana.  After joining, the squadron was re-designated as the 716th Radar Squadron (SAGE) on 15 October 1960. The radar squadron provided information 24/7 the SAGE Direction Center where it was analyzed to determine range, direction altitude speed and whether or not aircraft were friendly or hostile.  On 31 July 1963, the site was redesignated as NORAD ID Z-179.

An AN/FPS-26 FD height-finder radar was to have replaced one of the height-finder radars, but was never installed. One AN/FPS-90 was decommissioned in 1969.

In addition to the main facility, Kalispell operated several AN/FPS-14 Gap Filler sites:
 Yaak AFS, MT     (TM-179B/SM-151E) 
 Eureka, MT   (TM-179C/P-11B/SM-151F) 

Over the years, the equipment at the station was upgraded or modified to improve the efficiency and accuracy of the information gathered by the radars.  The 716th Radar Squadron (SAGE) was inactivated on 1 April 1978 as part of the draw down of Aerospace Defense Command, and the station turned over to the FAA, becoming a JSS site.

Circa 1977 the AN/FPS-90 was modified to an AN/FPS-116. In the early 1980s the AN/FPS-7B was replaced by an ARSR-3 search radar. The AN/FPS-116 was removed c. 1988. In the late 1990s, an ARSR-4 replaced the ARSR-3. The site remains in use as a JSS site today

Air Force units and assignments

Units
 716th Aircraft Control and Warning Squadron
 Activated at Geiger Field, Washington on 1 October 1958
 Moved to Kalispell AFS on 1 May 1959
 Redesignated as 716th Radar Squadron (SAGE) on 15 October 1960
 Redesignated as 716th Radar Squadron on 1 February 1974
 Inactivated on 1 April 1978

Assignments
 4700th Air Defense Wing, 1 May 1958
 29th Air Division, 15 February 1960
 Great Falls Air Defense Sector, 1 July 1960
 28th Air Division, 1 April 1966
 25th Air Division, 19 November 1969 - 1 April 1978

See also
 List of USAF Aerospace Defense Command General Surveillance Radar Stations

References

  Cornett, Lloyd H. and Johnson, Mildred W., A Handbook of Aerospace Defense Organization  1946 - 1980,  Office of History, Aerospace Defense Center, Peterson AFB, CO (1980).
 Winkler, David F. & Webster, Julie L., Searching the Skies, The Legacy of the United States Cold War Defense Radar Program,  US Army Construction Engineering Research Laboratories, Champaign, IL (1997).
 Information for Kalispell AFS, MT
 Youth With A Mission Montana -- About Us
 Kalispell AFS page on FortWiki

External links

Semi-Automatic Ground Environment sites
Aerospace Defense Command military installations
Installations of the United States Air Force in Montana
Buildings and structures in Flathead County, Montana
1959 establishments in Montana
1978 disestablishments in Montana
Military installations established in 1959
Military installations closed in 1978